"Remember Me" is a 1970 single recorded and released by singer Diana Ross on the Motown label and was included on her 1971 album Surrender. The song was released as the album's first single on December 8, 1970 by the label. It was written and produced by Ashford & Simpson. In the US, the song was Ross' third top forty pop hit within a year, peaking at number 16 on the Hot 100 chart and number 10 on the soul chart. It was also Diana Ross' third entry on the Easy Listening chart, where it went to number 20. It gave Diana her third gold single in a year and her third top 10 charting single in Cash Box, peaking at number eight. Overseas, "Remember Me" reached the top ten in the UK, where it reached number seven. It was the lead single from Ross' 1971 album, Surrender.

Overview
The song was written and produced by the Motown collaborators Ashford & Simpson. The song is written from the view of a spurned woman who requests that her ex-boyfriend remembers her for all the positive things she had brought to his life.

Personnel
Lead vocals by Diana Ross
Background vocals by Ashford & Simpson
Produced by Ashford & Simpson

Chart performance

Weekly charts

Year-end charts

Cover version
Boys Town Gang recorded a medley of "Remember Me" together with "Ain't No Mountain High Enough" in 1981. The single was a No. 5 U.S. Dance hit and a top 20 hit in Belgium and the Netherlands.

References

External links
 

1970 singles
Diana Ross songs
Songs written by Nickolas Ashford
Songs written by Valerie Simpson
Song recordings produced by Ashford & Simpson
1970 songs
Motown singles